In the mathematical field of graph theory, Fáry's theorem states that any simple, planar graph can be drawn without crossings so that its edges are straight line segments. That is, the ability to draw graph edges as curves instead of as straight line segments does not allow a larger class of graphs to be drawn.

Proof 

One way of proving Fáry's theorem is to use mathematical induction. Let    be a simple plane graph with  vertices; we may add edges if necessary so that  is a maximally plane graph. If  < 3, the result is trivial. If  ≥ 3, then all faces of   must be triangles, as we could add an edge into any face with more sides while preserving planarity, contradicting the assumption of maximal planarity. (Combinatorially isomorphic means that the vertices, edges, and faces in the new drawing can be made to correspond to those in the old drawing, such that all incidences between edges, vertices, and faces—not just between vertices and edges—are preserved.) Thus, we may assume that  ≥ 4.

Therefore each vertex in  has deficiency at most three, so there are at least four vertices with positive deficiency.

The induction step of this proof is illustrated at right.

Related results 
De Fraysseix, Pach and Pollack showed how to find in linear time a straight-line drawing in a grid with dimensions linear in the size of the graph, giving a universal point set with quadratic size. A similar method has been followed by Schnyder to prove enhanced bounds and a characterization of planarity based on the incidence partial order. His work stressed the existence of a particular partition of the edges of a maximal planar graph into three trees known as a Schnyder wood.

Tutte's spring theorem states that every 3-connected planar graph can be drawn on a plane without crossings so that its edges are straight line segments and an outside face is a convex polygon (Tutte 1963). It is so called because such an embedding can be found as the equilibrium position for a system of springs representing the edges of the graph.

Steinitz's theorem states that every 3-connected planar graph can be represented as the edges of a convex polyhedron in three-dimensional space.

The Circle packing theorem states that every planar graph may be represented as the intersection graph of a collection of non-crossing circles in the plane. Placing each vertex of the graph at the center of the corresponding circle leads to a straight line representation.

Heiko Harborth raised the question of whether every planar graph has a straight line representation in which all edge lengths are integers. The truth of Harborth's conjecture remains unknown . However, integer-distance straight line embeddings are known to exist for cubic graphs.

 raised the question of whether every graph with a linkless embedding in three-dimensional Euclidean space has a linkless embedding in which all edges are represented by straight line segments, analogously to Fáry's theorem for two-dimensional embeddings.

See also
Bend minimization

Notes

References 
.
.
.
.
.
.
.
.
.
 .
.
.
.

Planar graphs
Articles containing proofs
Theorems in graph theory